The 2014 Latrobe City Traralgon ATP Challenger 1 was a professional tennis tournament played on outdoor hard court. It was the second edition of the tournament which was part of the 2014 ATP Challenger Tour. It took place in Traralgon, Australia between 27 October – 2 November 2014. It was the first of two Traralgon Challengers in 2014.

Singles main draw entrants

Seeds

 Rankings are as of October 20, 2014.

Other entrants
The following players received wildcards into the singles main draw:
  Omar Jasika
  John Millman
  Christopher O'Connell
  Andrew Whittington

The following players received entry via protected ranking into the singles main draw:
   Jose Statham 

The following players received entry from the qualifying draw:
  James Eames 
  Greg Jones
  Keita Koyama
  Darren Polkinghorne

Champions

Singles

  Bradley Klahn def.  Jarmere Jenkins, 7–5, 6–1

Doubles

  Brydan Klein /  Dane Propoggia def.  Jarmere Jenkins /  Mitchell Krueger, 6–1, 1–6, [10–3]

References

External links
 Tournament Website
 ATP official site

Latrobe City Traralgon ATP Challenger 1
Latrobe City Traralgon ATP Challenger
Latrobe City Traralgon ATP Challenger 1